Konotop Raion is a raion in Sumy Oblast in Central Ukraine. The administrative center of the raion is the town of Konotop. Population: 

On 18 July 2020, as part of the administrative reform of Ukraine, the number of raions of Sumy Oblast was reduced to five, and the area of Konotop Raion was significantly expanded.  The January 2020 estimate of the raion population was

References

Raions of Sumy Oblast
1923 establishments in Ukraine